John Hare Kasley (January 2, 1916 – July 16, 1989) was an American competition swimmer who represented the United States at the 1936 Summer Olympics in Berlin.  Kasley competed in the semifinals of the men's 200-meter breaststroke, recording a time of 2:53.4.

Kasley attended the University of Michigan, and swam for the Michigan Wolverines swimming and diving team in National Collegiate Athletic Association (NCAA) competition from 1935 to 1937.  During his three-year college swimming career, he won three consecutive NCAA national championships in the 200-yard butterfly (1935, 1936, 1937), and was also a member of Michigan's NCAA-winning teams in the 300-yard medley relay (1935, 1936, 1937).

See also
 List of University of Michigan alumni
 World record progression 200 metres breaststroke

References

External links
 

1916 births
1989 deaths
American male breaststroke swimmers
Michigan Wolverines men's swimmers
Olympic swimmers of the United States
Sportspeople from Oak Park, Illinois
Swimmers at the 1936 Summer Olympics